The Meyer Site is an archaeological site near Westernport in Garrett County, Maryland, United States.  It is located along Chestnut Grove Road on the riverside edge of an alluvial bottom on the west side of the North Branch of the Potomac River.  It is the site of a Monongahela culture village, which is the uppermost Late Prehistoric village known on the North Branch.

It was listed on the National Register of Historic Places in 1973.

References

External links
, including photo from 1971, at Maryland Historical Trust

Archaeological sites on the National Register of Historic Places in Maryland
Archaeological sites in Garrett County, Maryland
Former populated places in Maryland
Monongahela culture
Native American history of Maryland
Native American populated places
National Register of Historic Places in Garrett County, Maryland
Populated places on the National Register of Historic Places